Placosoma is a lizard genus in the family Gymnophthalmidae. They are endemic to southern Brazil.

Species 
This small genus contains 4 species:
 Placosoma cipoense  – Cunha's Brazilian lizard
 Placosoma cordylinum 
 Placosoma glabellum 
 Placosoma limaverdorum

References

External links 

 
Lizards of South America
Reptiles of Brazil
Endemic fauna of Brazil
Lizard genera
Taxa named by Leopold Fitzinger